Pick 'Em is an album by bassist Ron Carter which was recorded at Van Gelder Studio in 1978 and released on the Milestone label in 1980.

Reception

The AllMusic review by Alex Henderson called it "an enjoyable disc that will appeal to those who have a taste for lavish orchestral jazz".

Track listing
All compositions by Ron Carter except where noted
 "All Blues" (Miles Davis) – 8:42
 "Opus 2" – 5:32
 "B and A" – 3:54
 "Pick 'Em" – 6:01
 "Tranquil" – 5:22
 "Eight" – 6:45

Personnel
Ron Carter – piccolo bass, bass, arranger
Kenny Barron - piano
Buster Williams – bass
Ben Riley - drums
John Abramowitz, Richard Locker, Charles McCracken, Kermit Moore – cello
Hugh McCracken – guitar, harmonica (track 4) 
Ralph MacDonald – percussion (tracks 4 & 5)

References

Milestone Records albums
Ron Carter albums
1980 albums
Albums recorded at Van Gelder Studio